The 1977 World Championship Tennis Finals was a tennis tournament played on indoor carpet courts. It was the 7th edition of the WCT Finals and was part of the 1977 World Championship Tennis circuit. It was played at the Moody Coliseum in Dallas, Texas in the United States and was held from May 10 through May 15, 1977.

Final

Singles

 Jimmy Connors defeated  Dick Stockton 6–7(5–7), 6–1, 6–4, 6–3
 It was Connors' 4th title of the year and the 70th of his career.

References

 
World Championship Tennis Finals
World Championship Tennis
World Championship Tennis Finals
World Championship Tennis Finals
WCT Finals